Kevin Leslie Iro (born 24 May 1968), also known by the nickname of '"The Beast", is a former professional rugby league footballer who played in the 1980s, 1990s and 2000s, and coached in the 2000s.

Background
Iro was born in Auckland, New Zealand. He is of Cook Islanders descent.

Iro is the younger brother of fellow New Zealand rugby league international Tony Iro. He is the father of Kayal Iro

Playing career
As a junior, he played for the Glen Innes Falcons, a feeder club to Ellerslie during the 1980s. He was St. Helens' lone try-scorer in their 1999 Super League Grand Final victory over Bradford Bulls. As Super League V champions, St. Helens played against 2000 NRL Premiers, the Brisbane Broncos in the 2001 World Club Challenge. Iro played at centre in St. Helens' victory.

In 2006 Iro coached the Cook Islands national rugby league team in a three match series against the New Zealand Māori side. In the third and deciding match Iro came out of retirement, scoring two tries in a 32–4 victory.
He also represented the Cook Islands at the 2006 Commonwealth Games playing rugby sevens.

References

External links
 Statistics at wigan.rlfans.com
 Statistics at saints.org.uk
 Profile at leedsrugby.dnsupdate.co.uk

1968 births
Living people
Commonwealth Games competitors for the Cook Islands
Cook Island rugby league coaches
Cook Island sportspeople
Cook Islands international rugby sevens players
Cook Islands national rugby league team captains
Cook Islands national rugby league team coaches
Cook Islands national rugby league team players
Hunter Mariners players
Junior Kiwis players
Leeds Rhinos players
Male rugby sevens players
Manly Warringah Sea Eagles players
Mount Albert Lions players
New Zealand national rugby league team players
New Zealand sportspeople of Cook Island descent
New Zealand rugby league coaches
New Zealand rugby league players
New Zealand expatriate sportspeople in England
New Zealand Warriors players
Rugby league centres
Rugby league five-eighths
Rugby league players from Auckland
Rugby league wingers
Rugby sevens players at the 2006 Commonwealth Games
St Helens R.F.C. players
Wigan Warriors players